Events in the year 1934 in the British Mandate of Palestine.

Incumbents
 High Commissioner – Sir Arthur Grenfell Wauchope
 Emir of Transjordan – Abdullah I bin al-Hussein
 Prime Minister of Transjordan – Ibrahim Hashem

Events

 According to official statistics there were 42,359 Jewish immigrants during 1934.

 19 February – The first organized group of Youth Aliyah children from Germany, organized by the Youth Aliyah Bureau, arrive in Palestine and is sent to study in Kibbutz Ein Harod.
 14 May – Severe rainstorms in Tiberias lead to a flood in which 35 people are killed and about 100 buildings are destroyed.
 18 July – The founding of settlement Kiryat Bialik by Jewish German immigrants of the Fifth Aliyah.
 December – National Defence Party (Palestine) established.

Unknown dates
 The Organized illegal Jewish immigration to Palestine begins in 1934, following the deteriorating situation of the German Jews after the Nazi Party rise to power in 1933 and also as a result of the adoption of anti-Semitic policies in other European countries which included pogroms, persecutions and restrictions.
 The "Sieff Institute" is established in 1934 in Rehovot, a research institute which later becomes the Weizmann Institute of Science.

Notable births
 13 January – Avraham Ravitz, Israeli politician and member of the Knesset (died 2009).
 15 January – Ephraim Stern, Israeli archaeologist
 17 February – Adiel Amorai, Israeli politician.
 21 February – David Avidan, Israeli poet, painter, filmmaker, publicist and playwright (died 1995).
 25 February – Meir Har-Zion, Israeli commando (died 2014). 
 5 March – Daniel Kahneman, Israeli-American economist, Nobel Prize laureate.
 8 March – Yaakov Shabtai, Israeli writer (died 1981).
 21 April – Meron Benvenisti, Israeli political scientist and deputy mayor of Jerusalem
 13 May – Ehud Netzer, Israeli archaeologist (died 2010).
 9 May – Zvi Alderoti, Israeli politician.
 24 June – Daoud Hanania, Jordanian heart surgeon.
 28 June – Eitan Berglas, Israeli economist and banker, chair of Bank Hapoalim (died 1992).
 26 July – Raaphi Persitz, Israeli chess master (died 2009).
 22 October – David Libai, Israeli jurist and politician.
 9 November – Shulamit Lapid, Israeli novelist and playwright.
 18 November – Sara Japhet, Israeli biblical scholar.
 7 December – Avraham Katz-Oz, Israeli politician.
 12 December – Haim Kaufman, Israeli politician (died 1995).
 Full date unknown
 Amos Lapidot, Israeli fighter pilot, former commander of the Israeli Air Force (died 2019)
 David Ivry, Israeli general and diplomat, former commander of the Israeli Air Force.
 Abu Ali Iyad, Palestinian Arab and senior Fatah field commander based in Syria and Jordan during the 1960s and early 1970s (died 1971).

Notable deaths

 4 July – Hayim Nahman Bialik (born 1873), Russian-born Jewish poet and one of the pioneers of modern Hebrew poetry.
 27 March – Musa al-Husayni (born 1853), Palestinian Arab politician and leader of the Palestinian Arab national movement from 1922 until 1934. He never recovered from the beating he received from the Palestine Police in Jaffa five months earlier. 

 2 November – Edmond James de Rothschild (born 1845), French-born Jewish philanthropist and a major supporter of Zionism during the First Aliyah period.

References 

 
Palestine
Years in Mandatory Palestine